Nomane Rural LLG is a local-level government (LLG) of Chimbu Province, Papua New Guinea. The Nomane language is spoken in the LLG.

Wards
01. Dekamane
02. Awna
03. Gaimo
04. Kolu
05. Oru
06. Monowari
07. Kora
08. Dama
09. Hopum
10. Yuwai
11. Kalem
12. Kukama
13. Apuri

References

Local-level governments of Chimbu Province